Boban Nikolov (born 28 July 1994) is a Macedonian footballer who plays for Liga I club FCSB and North Macedonia as a central midfielder.

Club career

Viitorul Constanța
On 8 March 2013, Nikolov made his debut for Viitorul Constanța in the Liga I, in a 4–1 defeat to Gaz Metan Mediaș. On 19 May of the same year, he scored his first Liga I goal in a 5–2 win against Steaua București.

Lecce
On 19 January 2021 he was signed by Italian Serie B club Lecce.

Sheriff Tiraspol
Seven months later, on 20 August 2021, he signed for Moldovan National Division club Sheriff Tiraspol.

FCSB
On 17 September 2022, Nikolov signed for Liga I club FCSB on a one-year deal, with an option to extend for a further year.

International career
On 29 May 2016, Nikolov made his international debut against Azerbaijan, and on 24 March 2017 he scored his first goal in the 2018 World Cup qualifier against Liechtenstein. He was also a regular in the U21 and U19 categories, where he also served as captain. As of April 2020, he has earned a total of 22 caps, scoring 2 goals. He represented the nation at UEFA Euro 2020, their first major tournament.

Career statistics

Club

International

International goals
As of match played 5 June 2022. North Macedonia score listed first, score column indicates score after each Nikolov goal.

Honours

Club
Vardar
1. MFL: 2015–16, 2016–17
Macedonian Super Cup: 2015
Fehérvár 
Nemzeti Bajnokság I: 2017–18
Magyar Kupa: 2018–19

Sheriff Tiraspol 
 Divizia Națională: 2021–22
 Moldovan Cup: 2021–22

References

External links
Profile at Macedonian Football 

1994 births
Living people
Sportspeople from Štip
Association football midfielders
Macedonian footballers
North Macedonia youth international footballers
North Macedonia under-21 international footballers
North Macedonia international footballers
FC Viitorul Constanța players
FK Vardar players
Fehérvár FC players
U.S. Lecce players
FC Sheriff Tiraspol players
FC Steaua București players
Liga I players
Macedonian First Football League players
Nemzeti Bajnokság I players
Serie B players
Moldovan Super Liga players
UEFA Euro 2020 players
Macedonian expatriate footballers
Expatriate footballers in Romania
Macedonian expatriate sportspeople in Romania
Expatriate footballers in Hungary
Macedonian expatriate sportspeople in Hungary
Expatriate footballers in Italy
Macedonian expatriate sportspeople in Italy
Expatriate footballers in Moldova
Macedonian expatriate sportspeople in Moldova